The 2021 General Tire 200 was the third stock car race of the 2021 ARCA Menards Series season and the 59th iteration of the event. The race was held on Saturday, April 24, 2021, in Lincoln, Alabama at Talladega Superspeedway, a 2.66 miles (4.28 km) permanent triangle-shaped superspeedway. The race took the scheduled 76 laps to complete. At race's end, Corey Heim for Venturini Motorsports would hold off the field on a final lap restart to win his 3rd ARCA Menards Series win of his career and the second of the season. To fill out the podium, Dave Mader III of Spraker Racing Enterprises and Nick Sanchez of Rev Racing would finish second and third, respectively.

The race was marred by a crash involving Derrick Lancaster late in the race. With five to go, Lancaster hit the wall on the backstretch, resulting in a fiery crash. Lancaster would suffer numerous first, second, and third degree burns to his body and suffered pneumonia. The crash would lead to debate in within the Lancaster family if he should ever race again.

Background 

Talladega Superspeedway, originally known as Alabama International Motor Superspeedway (AIMS), is a motorsports complex located north of Talladega, Alabama. It is located on the former Anniston Air Force Base in the small city of Lincoln. The track is a tri-oval and was constructed in the 1960s by the International Speedway Corporation, a business controlled by the France family. Talladega is most known for its steep banking and the unique location of the start/finish line that's located just past the exit to pit road. The track currently hosts the NASCAR series such as the NASCAR Cup Series, Xfinity Series and the Camping World Truck Series. Talladega is the longest NASCAR oval with a length of 2.66-mile-long (4.28 km) tri-oval like the Daytona International Speedway, which also is a 2.5-mile-long (4 km) tri-oval.

Entry list

Starting lineup 
No qualifying session was held; instead, the lineup was determined by the previous season's owner's points and provisionals. As a result, Ty Gibbs of Joe Gibbs Racing won the pole.

Race results

References 

2021 ARCA Menards Series
NASCAR races at Talladega Superspeedway
General Tire 200 (Talladega)
General Tire 200 (Talladega)